The Gifted: Graduation is a 2020 Thai television series which serves as a sequel to The Gifted (2018). The series stars an ensemble cast featuring Korapat Kirdpan (Nanon), Wachirawit Ruangwiwat (Chimon), Harit Cheewagaroon (Sing), Ramida Jiranorraphat (Jane), Atthaphan Phunsawat (Gun), Pattadon Janngeon (Fiat), and Napasorn Weerayuttvilai (Puimek) reprising their roles, joined by Nattawat Finkler (Patrick), Chanikarn Tangabodi (Prim), and Phuwin Tangsakyuen (Phuwin). It chronicles the events two years after The Gifted, wherein the Gifted Class, students with superpowers, join hands in bringing down the powerful school director and his oppressive system.

Directed by The Gifted co-director Waasuthep Ketpetch and collaboratively produced by GMMTV and Parbdee Taweesuk, The Gifted: Graduation was one of the twelve television series for 2020 showcased by GMMTV during their "New & Next" event on 15 October 2019. It premiered on GMM 25 and LINE TV on 6 September 2020, airing on Sundays at 20:30 ICT and 22:30 ICT, respectively. The series concluded on 29 November 2020.

Synopsis 
Set two years after the events of The Gifted (2018), The Gifted: Graduation chronicles the struggles of Ritdha High School's Gifted Class, students with superpowers, as they join hands in bringing down the powerful school director (Wanchana Sawasdee) and his oppressive system, a mission started by the class' leading students—the mind-controller Pang (Korapat Kirdpan) and technopath Wave (Wachirawit Ruangwiwat). This sequel also showed how the fight is beyond what happens in Ritdha High School, expanding into a full blown power struggle between Director Supot and the Ministry of Education.

Cast and characters

Main

Gifted Class 15 
 Korapat Kirdpan (Nanon) as Pawaret "Pang" Sermrittirong
 a student of Ritdha High School and member of the Gifted Program Class 15; the very first Gifted student from Class VIII, the school's most inferior class. Pang has the power of mind control, in which he can compel someone to do whatever he wishes through physical contact with the subject and feeling their heartbeat. However, Pang's powers evolved such that he can command multiple people to do his bidding without physical contact.
 Wachirawit Ruangwiwat (Chimon) as Wasuthorn "Wave" Worachotmethee
 a student of Class I from Ritdha High School and member of the Gifted Program Class 15. Wave has the power of technopathy, the ability to control and manipulate electronic machines through contact. Wave's powers have improved such that he can also work on electronic machines that are damaged beyond repair.
 Pattadon Janngeon (Fiat) as Thanakorn "Korn" Gorbgoon
 a student of Class I from Ritdha High School and member of the Gifted Program Class 15; leader of the Anti-Gifted (although it is revealed that he was being controlled by Director Supot). Korn has the ability to remain awake for days without getting sleepy or fatigued. After becoming disgruntled due to his misfortunes and deteriorating trust with his potential and his classmates in Class 15, his mental health spirals down and he becomes the leader of the Anti-Gifted, a covert group of Ritdha students who resort to violence in fighting against the Director and the Gifted Program. His potential develops to include regeneration, which gives his body the capacity to heal itself within 24 hours.
 Ramida Jiranorraphat (Jane) as Irin "Claire" Jaratpun
 a student of Class I from Ritdha High School and member of the Gifted Program Class 15. Claire is a synesthete who can see a person's aura and associate the color of the aura with a certain kind of emotion. Her potential develops to being able to interpret the cause or details of someone's current emotion.
 Atthaphan Phunsawat (Gun) as Punn Taweesilp
 a student of Class I from Ritdha High School and member of the Gifted Program Class 15. Punn has the power of imitation and ability mastering, which enables him to perfectly copy a skill by watching or studying but causes him to develop multiple personalities. His potential develops to being able to mimic and master the potentials of his fellow Gifted.
 Napasorn Weerayuttvilai (Puimek) as Patchamon "Mon" Pitiwongkorn
 a student of Class II from Ritdha High School and member of the Gifted Program Class 15. Mon possesses superhuman strength with enhanced agility, dexterity and coordination; however, her body produces pheromones that are excreted through her bodily fluids (e.g. sweat and tears) and can cause a person to turn insane or violent.
 Harit Cheewagaroon (Sing) as Wichai "Ohm" Sai-Ngern
 a student of Class II from Ritdha High School and member of the Gifted Program Class 15. Ohm can make himself invisible, and can make objects (including humans) disappear and bring them back again by will.
 Chayapol Jutamat as (AJ) Chanuj "Jack" Saeliu, and Chayakorn Jutamat as (JJ) Chanet "Jo" Saeliu
 the identical twin students of Class III from Ritdha High School and members of the Gifted Program Class 15. Jack and Jo have the ability to respond to stimuli in sync.

Gifted Class 16 
 Nattawat Finkler (Patrick) as Tharm "Time" Thamrongsawat
 a 10th grade student - Class I from Ritdha High School and member of the Gifted Program Class 16. Time initiates a campaign for the reinstatement of the Gifted Program after learning about its termination due to the chaos allegedly caused by the Gifted Class 15. He becomes an "informal" Gifted student after sneaking into the Gifted Class 15's hideout and being able to hear the Gifted trigger soundwave which Wave played during the Class' meeting. With Class 15' help, he discovers his potential of locality tracking, the ability to ascertain the exact location of a person or object he is familiar with. Time must also be familiar with the place, so he uses a map to locate someone or something in a place he is not too familiar with.
 Chanikarn Tangabodi (Prim) as Natnicha "Grace" Wongwattana
 Intira Charoenpura as adult Grace
 a 10th grade student - Class I from Ritdha High School and member of the Gifted Program Class 16. Grace is a late bloomer who discovers or activates her potential later compared to her peers in Class 16. She has the power of alternate-selves contacting, which enables her to contact and be connected to the future (adult) version of herself. When her future self takes over her body, she manifests a behavior similar to having multiple personalities, such as having a different attitude, being capable of doing things she cannot do in her normal state and memory gaps. This potential also makes her capable of knowing the future through her future self, which then helps her evade future events or guide her course of action while in the present.
 Phuwin Tangsakyuen as Thammarong "Third" Decharat
 a 11th grade student - Class I from Ritdha High School and member of the Gifted Program Class 16. Third was appointed as a student inspector by the new Head of Administration. He possesses the potential of mind-reading, which enables him to read the mind of person and get the desired information when he asks a proper question to the subject. He becomes one of the most important characters in the series.

The adults 
 Wanchana Sawasdee (Bird) as Director Supot Chueamanee
 Tawan Vihokratana (Tay) as young Supot Chueamanee
 the Director of Ritdha High School and master of the Gifted Program. Mr. Supot has the same, but stronger and evolved, mind control power as Pang. Since he and Pang have the same power, they cannot use their powers against each other. He strongly believes in a society where the strong leads the weaker or inferior ones, as reflected in the school's student hierarchy system, his abusive treatment of low-class students and his bias towards the Gifted. Thirty years ago, he brainwashes his friend into believing he is Supot and he has a mind control superpower in order to use him to gain power over the Ministry of Education and establish the Gifted Program. He works with the fake Supot in discovering the evolutionary roots of the Gifted and in developing the potential activation sound wave. Their failed human experiment on fake Supot's girlfriend Nate due an unforeseen virus in her brain unintentionally leads to the Ministry developing the Nyx-88 bioweapon.
 Chatchawit Techarukpong (Victor) as Teacher Porama "Pom" Wongrattana
 the class adviser of Ritdha High School's Gifted Program and a Gifted Batch 3 alumnus. Mr. Pom has the power of memory manipulation, in which he can erase someone's memory by touching his or her head, before which he has to put the subject first under hypnosis using sound with a regular tempo (through a metronome).
 Manatsanun Panlertwongskul (Donut) as Ms. Darin Wattanasin
 the Deputy Director of Academic Affairs of Ritdha High School. Darin is appointed to the position by the Minister of Education Mr. Pichet himself to do a secret mission, which involves subduing Mr. Supot using the Nyx-88 bioweapon.
 Jirakit Thawornwong (Mek) as Chanon "Non" Taweepong
 Mr. Pom's batchmate in the Gifted Program Batch 3 and the first Gifted student to be eliminated from the program. Non has the power of high-accuracy calculation. He fought against the Director and attempted to expose his crimes against non-Gifted students but loses when the Director compels Mr. Pom to erase his memories, recovering them 10 years later. Though he decides not to revive his fight against the Director for fear of losing his memories again, he gets an IT support job in the Ministry of Education while secretly investigating the Gifted Program. At the end of the series, Non and Mr. Pom work together with the Gifted students to bring down Director Supot.
 Poramet Noi-am as Mr. Pichet
 the newly appointed Minister of Education who designates Ms. Darin as Ritdha High School's Deputy Director of Academic Affairs for a secret mission. Thirty years ago, he was the head of the Ministry's top-secret Division of Special Personnel Development which tracks Thais with superpowers in order to use them for the country's development and, at the same time, ensuring that they will not be a threat to national security. After learning of Supot and Yuth's failed experiment on Nate, he discovers that Nate's brain is infected with a mutated virus that only affects Gifted people. He instructed the Division to synthesize the virus, leading to the creation of the Nyx-88, a bioweapon the Ministry can use against the Gifted.

Supporting

Gifted Class 16 
 Passatorn Koolkang (Captain) as O
 a 10th Grade – Class I student from Ritdha High School and member of the Gifted Program Class 16; one of Time's friends. O has the potential of enhanced memory which enables him to remember large amounts of data in graphic and textual formats.
 Kittiphop Sereevichayasawat (Satang) as Bom
 a 10th Grade – Class I student from Ritdha High School and member of the Gifted Program Class 16; one of Time's friends. Bom has the power of psychokinesis which enables him to move objects using his mind.
 Pichaya Pocharoen (Earth)
 Narabodin Deeboonmee (Winner)
 Dylan Alexander Bryant
 Palita Kitiyodom
 Rawipha Thananphongthon
 Kittiphat Si-bunrueang
 Waraphon Saisin

Ritdha High School employees 
 Ronnakon Sanitpraphatson as Mr. Wisit
 the new Head of Administration of Ritdha High School. In stark contrast to his predecessor Ms. Ladda, Mr. Wisit is less strict and, instead of dealing student delinquents himself, he creates a group of four student inspectors (which includes Third).
 Dhammarong Sermrittirong (SandOtnim) as Grade 12 – Class VIII's math teacher
 Patha Thongpan (O) as Grade 10 – Class I's teacher-proctor during the Placement Exam
 Chittaya Chanphuang as Grade 10 – Class I teacher

Student inspectors 
 Napolpong Sooksombut
 Tatpong Sermpornwiwat
 Thivara Prasansapakit

Anti-Gifted 
 Siraphat Arun as Jay
 a Class V 12th grade student of Ritdha High School; member of the Anti-Gifted. Under Korn's command, Jay steals a vial of Nyx-88 from Ms. Darin.
 Chatchanat Paphawiwattananont
 Sarayut Phruetthawongsiri
 Akkhadet Chuwong

Grade 10 students 
 Nonthakorn Chatchuea (Rossi)
 Norrapat Phonkhit
 Nicole Great Ngeesanthia
 Thanakon Milap

Ministry of Education officials 
 Kanokphon Ruamtham
 Thongchai Ma-men
 Aekapong Buapung
 Phatraphi Ninlakhun
 Thiti Arakphotchong

Guest role 

 Poramaporn Jangkamol (June) as Nayanate "Nate" Jiraarpa, a.k.a. Kanokpan Rattanadecha ( 11)
 Tipnaree Weerawatnodom (Namtan) ( 1, 8, 10 and 11) as young Nate
 the girlfriend of the fake Supot Chueamanee; a doctor by profession. Thirty years ago, Nate volunteered as the first human subject in Yuth/real Supot and fake Supot's experimentation of the potential activation sound wave despite having a fever and sustained an severe brain damage consequently. It is revealed that her illness is caused by an unforeseen enterovirus which infected her brain and has mutated (due to the potential activation sound wave) to cause severe illness to activated Gifted people. The virus in her brain was synthesized by Division of Special Personnel Development into the Nyx-88 bioweapon. She was then sneaked out of the Ministry by Supot who faked her death and treated her from the infection using an anti-Nyx-88 machine he invented. She was also compelled by Supot to live under her new name Kanokpan Rattanadecha and to work as a provincial school teacher to keep her away from Ministry.
 Thanat Lowkhunsombat (Lee) (Eps. 1, 8 and 10) as fake Supot Chueamanee
 Mr. Supot's friend and research partner 30 years ago; Nate's boyfriend. He was brainwashed by Supot into believing he is "Supot" and he has the potential of mind control. Unbeknownst to him, he is being used by Supot in establishing the Gifted Program and achieving the latter's greed for power with less interference from the Ministry. He is later brainwashed by Supot into killing himself after Supot reveals to him all of his schemes and intentions.
 Apichaya Thongkham (Lilly) as Chayanit "Namtaan" Prachkarit (Eps. 11 and 13)
 a former student of Ritdha High School in the Gifted Program Class 15. Namtaan has the power of psychometry, the ability to see or hear associated events on an object or person through contact. A year before the events of The Gifted: Graduation, she was nearly killed in a bombing incident in Ritdha that was intended by the Anti-Gifted for Mr. Supot (the incident is then blamed against the Gifted Class 15 and pushed the Ministry to terminate the Gifted Program). Her mother brought her out of Thailand, consequently, for her treatment and recovery. While abroad, she keeps in touch with Ohm whom she is close with since 2018. It is later revealed that Director Supot brainwashed Namtaan's mother to take her away as he has a shady past which he cannot risk being exposed by Namtaan's powers.

Episodes

Notes

References

External links 
 The Gifted: Graduation Official Trailer
 The Gifted: Graduation on GMM 25 website 
 The Gifted: Graduation on LINE TV
 
 GMMTV

Television series by GMMTV
2020 Thai television series debuts
2020 Thai television series endings
GMM 25 original programming
Science fantasy television series
Television series by Parbdee Taweesuk